Gowenlock is a surname. Notable people with the surname include:
 Alice Gowenlock (1878–1957), English badminton player
 Ernest Gowenlock (1890–1918), Australian rugby league footballer